Raphael Aflalo Lopes Martins (born 8 July 1996) is a Brazilian professional footballer who plays as a goalkeeper for Portuguese club Felgueiras on loan from Portimonense.

Club career
Aflalo made his professional debut with Aves in a 1-0 Primeira Liga loss to Porto on 3 November 2019.

On 18 August 2021, he joined Felgueiras on loan.

Personal life
On 20 April 2017, Aflalo fatally struck and killed a 17-year old in Brazil. In September 2019 Aflalo was not charged with homicide, his defense stating his vision was obstructed by another vehicle. Aflalo paid compensation to the victim's family to close the civil case. In March 2022, Aflalo received a suspended prison sentence for his role in the fatal accident and was required to carry out community service, as well as pay a fine. Police documents revealed that he had been speeding and his driving licence had expired.

References

External links
 

1996 births
Footballers from São Paulo
Living people
Brazilian footballers
Association football goalkeepers
SC Mirandela players
C.D. Aves players
Portimonense S.C. players
F.C. Felgueiras 1932 players
Primeira Liga players
Campeonato de Portugal (league) players
Brazilian expatriate footballers
Expatriate footballers in Portugal
Brazilian expatriate sportspeople in Portugal